This article will list the confirmed women's squads lists for the 2022 Badminton Asia Team Championships. The ranking stated are based on the BWF World Ranking date on 8 February 2022 as per tournament's prospectus. Due to the COVID-19 pandemic, Chinese Taipei and Thailand have withdrawn from the tournament, and Singapore subsequently withdrew from the tournament after 3 players in the team recently recovered from COVID-19.

Group Y

Japan
8 players are scheduled to represent Japan in the women's team competition of the 2022 Badminton Asia Team Championships.

India
10 players are scheduled to represent India in the women's team competition of the 2022 Badminton Asia Team Championships.

Malaysia
12 players are scheduled to represent Malaysia in the women's team competition of the 2022 Badminton Asia Team Championships.

Group Z

South Korea
8 players are scheduled to represent South Korea in the women's team competition of the 2022 Badminton Asia Team Championships.

Indonesia
10 players are scheduled to represent Indonesia in the women's team competition of the 2022 Badminton Asia Team Championships.

Hong Kong
10 players are scheduled to represent Hong Kong in the women's team competition of the 2022 Badminton Asia Team Championships.

Kazakhstan
5 players are scheduled to represent Kazakhstan in the women's team competition of the 2022 Badminton Asia Team Championships.

References

2022 Badminton Asia Team Championships